Marzęcino  is a village in the administrative district of Gmina Nowy Dwór Gdański, within Nowy Dwór Gdański County, Pomeranian Voivodeship, in northern Poland.

The village has a population of 700. It includes Poland's lowest point at 2,07 m below sea level (until 2013 point at 1,73 below sea level in Raczki Elbląskie was considered the lowest).

References 

Villages in Nowy Dwór Gdański County